Minton may refer to:

Places

 Minton, Saskatchewan, a Canadian village
 Minton, Shropshire, a hamlet in the parish of Church Stretton, England
 Minton, a  fictional town in New England featured in the 1860 novel The Ebony Idol by G.M. Flanders

People with the given name
 Minton Warren (1850–1907), American classical scholar

Other uses
 Minton (surname)

See also
 Mintons, an English pottery manufacturing company
 Minton's Playhouse, a bar and jazz club in New York City, United States
 Mintonette, original name for the sport volleyball